Vincenzo Bettiza (7 June 1927 – 28 July 2017) was a Yugoslavian-born Italian novelist, journalist and politician.

Biography
Bettiza was born in Dalmatia, then part of Yugoslavia, in a rich Dalmatian Italian-Croatian family. His mother stemmed from a family of the Croatian island of Brač.  His family owned the most important enterprise in Dalmatia, the Gilardi e Bettiza cement factory, in the city of Split. In 1941, Axis Powers Italy and Germany invaded Yugoslavia. During Italian occupation, Bettiza's father helped many Croatian people during the war and took many of them out of Fascist prison. Enzo's cousin Pietro threw a bomb on the Italian army band, since they played Fascist marches, while Enzo himself boycotted Fascist gatherings and organizations. In 1944, the city was again rejoined to Croatia in new Yugoslavia. Many Italian families left already after the fall of Mussolini, after they realized that things were going badly in the country. Some Italian and mixed remained, part of them used the opportunity to opt for Italian citizenship. New authorities were interested in dealing with those who were collaborating with the occupiers, and all others whom they considered as the "enemy of people", either Croats, Italians or others. Their assets were nationalized. Bettiza moved to Gorizia after the end of World War II and the re-annexation of his native land to Croatia, at the age of 18. Later he moved to Trieste, and then to Milan: here he always declared to be living as "an exiled".

Bettiza has been director of several Italian newspaper and author of numerous books. as a journalist he devoted his attention to Eastern European countries and nationalities, and Southeastern Europe, Yugoslavian area in particular.

In the period 1957-1965 he was foreign correspondent for the newspaper La Stampa, first from Vienna and then from Moscow. Later he moved to Corriere della Sera, for which he worked for ten years.

In 1974, together with Indro Montanelli, founded the Milanese newspaper il Giornale nuovo, for which he was co-director until 1983.

Starting from 1976, he was member of the Italian Senate and the European Parliament. He lived in Rome with his family and was married a few times. His last wife, Laura Laurenzi, is an Italian writer.

Bettiza's major novel, I fantasmi di Mosca (Phantoms of Moscow) is credited as the most extended published novel written in Italian language.

He died on 29 July 2017 at the age of 90.

Selected bibliography
Mito e realtà di Trieste
Il mistero di Lenin
Saggi, viaggi, personaggi
Non una vita
L'eclisse del comunismo
Quale PCI? Anatomia di una crisi (1969)
La campagna elettorale
Il fantasma di Trieste
L'anno della tigre
I fantasmi di Mosca (1993)
Esilio (1995)
L'ombra rossa
Via Solferino
Mostri sacri
Corone e Maschere
La cavalcata del Secolo (2000)
Viaggio nell'ignoto
Sogni di Atlante
Il libro perduto

Awards and medals 
Croatian President Stipe Mesić awarded him with "Red Danice hrvatske s likom Marka Marulića", after the proposal of the journalists from Split.
 : Knight Grand Cross of the Order of Merit of the Italian Republic (28 may 2003)

Sources 

1927 births
2017 deaths
Writers from Split, Croatia
Journalists from Split, Croatia
Politicians from Split, Croatia
Italian people of Croatian descent
Croatian people of Italian descent
Italian Liberal Party politicians
Senators of Legislature VII of Italy
Italian Socialist Party MEPs
MEPs for Italy 1979–1984
MEPs for Italy 1989–1994
Italian male writers
Italian journalists
Italian male journalists
Italian newspaper founders
Italian newspaper editors
Italian anti-communists
Premio Campiello winners
Knights Grand Cross of the Order of Merit of the Italian Republic